Grenville is a village municipality in the Argenteuil Regional County Municipality of the Laurentides region of Quebec, Canada. It is located opposite Hawkesbury, Ontario, on the Ottawa River.

History
Although Grenville was already shown on the Gale and Duberger Map of 1795, it was not until January 28, 1808, that Grenville Township was officially established; the township's name commemorated Lord George Grenville.  Two years later, in 1810, the first French and English settlers arrived in the area.

Its strategic location on the Ottawa River and the construction of the Carillon Canal in 1819 led to the town's real growth. In 1826 the first general store opened and in 1828, the first school. In 1830 "Kingsey" sawmill was built, and a flour mill was added in 1838. In 1857 construction began on the Carillon and Grenville Railway, which was completed six years later.

In 1861 the village and its surroundings had about 900 inhabitants. On January 1, 1876, the Village Municipality of Grenville was formed at which time it exceeded one thousand persons.

In 1910 the Carillon and Grenville Railway was abandoned and later on dismantled.

Grenville Canal
The impetus for these canals was the War of 1812. During this war, attacks along the Saint Lawrence River jeopardized the communication lines between Kingston and Montreal, the two main military positions of Upper and Lower Canada. The Ottawa River Canal and the Rideau Canal were thus designed as an alternative military supply route in the event of war with the Americans.

Work on the canal began in 1818 with the construction of a storage warehouse. In 1819 Captain Henry Vernet of the Royal Engineers arrived from Britain to lead the construction of the project. Hundreds of Irish immigrants and French Canadians were used to excavate the canal under the direction of a hundred British soldiers.

The military requirements decided all aspects of the canal. These dimensions, standards adopted for military use, were insufficient for any commercial use. Forestry had become the main economic activity in this region, and from 1867, local business people demanded that the government carry out improvements to the network because the original canal network had become outdated. In 1870 the Canals Commission recommended making the Ottawa River deeper between Lachine and Ottawa. Therefore, between 1873 and 1882, the Grenville and Carillon Canals were enlarged (the dam built upstream from the village of Carillon raised the level of the Ottawa River at Chute-à-Blondeau, making the need for a lock there no longer necessary).

This work substantially and irreversibly changed the canal network. The new water level flooded Greece's Point and its surroundings several feet underwater and inundated the rapids of Long-Sault, transforming them into calm water. Shortly afterwards, the steel swing bridge and canal locks were dismantled.

Demographics 

Mother tongue (2006):
 English as first language: 9%
 French as first language: 88%
 English and French as first language: 2%
 Other as first language: 1%

Local government
List of former mayors:

 Ronald Tittlit (2003–2015)
 Luc Grondin (2015–2019)
 Pierre Thauvette (2019–present)

Education
The Commission scolaire de la Rivière-du-Nord operates French-language public schools.
 École Dansereau/Saint-Martin
 École polyvalente Lavigne in Lachute

The Sir Wilfrid Laurier School Board operates the English-language public schools.
Grenville Elementary School
 Laurentian Regional High School in Lachute

Notable people
 Marcel Desjardins (1941–2003), journalist, news editor and director

See also 
 List of village municipalities in Quebec
 Long-Sault Bridge

References

External links

Incorporated places in Laurentides
Villages in Quebec